Anticipation is the sixth album by comedian Lewis Black. It was released on August 5, 2008, on Comedy Central Records.  The album consists of stand-up material he has used on his tours over a three-year period, and was recorded on September 21, 2007, in Wausau, Wisconsin.

The album cover features part of the word "Anticipation" while the back features the rest of the word.  It was designed for people to think Black was "anti-something".

Track listing 
 This Moment – 3:55
 My.......Virginity – 11:00
 Golfers – 7:01
 Gamblers – 1:51
 Xmas – 2:30
 Xmas Halftime – 3:05
 Santa – 8:05
 Chanooookah – 2:58
 Chanukah – 4:45
 A Great Headline – 2:38
 Blueberry Pancakes – 4:35

References 

Lewis Black albums
2008 live albums
Comedy Central Records live albums
Stand-up comedy albums
Spoken word albums by American artists
Live spoken word albums
2000s comedy albums